Gals and Pals was a Swedish vocal group founded in 1962 by Lasse Bagge.  The group was active until 1967.   The ensemble's first members were, besides Bagge: Kerstin Bagge, Ulla Hallin, Pia Lang, Svante Thuresson, Leppe Sundevall and Beppo Gräsman.  Later, members included Monica Dominique, Gillis Broman and Lena Willemark.  The first time the group was on stage was in the show "FiFajFoFum eller Hur" in Berns Salonger in 1963, together with Catrin Westerlund and Carl-Gustaf Lindstedt. 

Many of the Gals and Pals Swedish lyrics were written by Beppe Wolgers, but the group also collaborated with Povel Ramel and Tage Danielsson and Hans Alfredson.  Their non-Swedish repertoire consisted largely of songs written by Burt Bacharach.

Discography
Gals and Pals sings Gals and Pals' favorites (1964)
Gals and Pals på nya äfventyr (1965)
Sing Something for Everyone (1966)
I San Francisco (1967)
Vocals 1963-1967 (1993)
Guldkorn (2000)

1962 establishments in Sweden
1967 disestablishments in Sweden
Swedish musical groups
Musical groups established in 1962
Musical groups disestablished in 1967